Cheng Enze (Chinese:程恩泽/程恩澤, 1785–1837) was a Chinese scholar and poet of late Qing Dynasty. Cheng studied with Ling Tingkan, and obtained Jinshi in 1811, later became a compiler of Hanlin Academy and at last was promoted as Hubu Shilang. He presented an idea that "anyone who want to make acquainted with Yili (义理, lit.Argumentation) must start with exegesis", and implemented it into his poetry writing. He was interested in Li Shangyin's poems at first, but later preferred the style of Han Yu and Huang Tingjian. Zheng zhen, He Shaoji and Mo youzhi were his students.

References

Qing dynasty poets
1785 births
1837 deaths
Qing dynasty politicians from Anhui
Politicians from Huangshan
Poets from Anhui